Comilla Airport  is a public use airport located near Comilla, Bangladesh.

Airlines and destinations
The Airport is not currently in operation. No scheduled flights are available for this airport.

See also
 List of airports in Bangladesh

References

External links 
 Airport record for Comilla Airport at Landings.com

Airports in Bangladesh
Cumilla